Wilburt Schardt (January 20, 1886 – July 20, 1964) was a pitcher in Major League Baseball. Schardt pitched for the Brooklyn Dodgers from 1911 to 1912.

External links

1886 births
1964 deaths
Baseball players from Cleveland
Major League Baseball pitchers
Brooklyn Dodgers players
La Crosse Outcats players
Milwaukee Brewers (minor league) players
Newark Indians players
Indianapolis Indians players
Sioux City Indians players